Karla Jay (born February 22, 1947) is a distinguished professor emerita at Pace University, where she taught English and directed the women's and gender studies program between 1974 and 2009. A pioneer in the field of lesbian and gay studies, she is widely published.

Early life and education
Jay was born Karla Jayne Berlin in Brooklyn, New York, to Rhoda and Abraham Berlin, who worked for a dunnage company on the Red Hook (Brooklyn) docks. Raised in a non-observant, largely secular Jewish home, she attended the Berkeley Institute, a private girls' school in Brooklyn. In 1964 she enrolled at Barnard College, where she majored in French and graduated in 1968 after having taken part in the student demonstrations at Columbia University.

Career
While she shared many of the goals of the radical left-wing of the late 1960s, Jay was at odds with the male-supremacist behavior of many of the movement's leaders. In 1969, she became a member of Redstockings. 
Jay, who had been aware of her lesbianism since high school, came out to her consciousness-raising group in Redstockings.  At around the same time she began using the name Karla Jay to reflect her feminist principles.

When activists founded the Gay Liberation Front (GLF) in the wake of the Stonewall Riots of June 1969, Jay, openly lesbian, became an early member and an active participant. She balanced attendance at GLF meetings with graduate school at New York University, where she majored in comparative literature. She was one of the few women actively involved in the early gay rights movement on both coasts.

Jay, along with Lee Mason and other LGBT+ artists and activists helped create the Gay-In III festival in Griffith Park, Los Angeles in September 1970. This festival was intended to be, in the words of Karla Jay herself, one of “these queer ‘love fests’... and [they] included kissing booths, face painting, marijuana, vodka-spiked oranges, guerilla theatre, fake marriages, voter registration and advice regarding arrests.” In reality, the festival was poorly attended but continued the precedent of such festivals, such as the ubiquitous gay pride parades. Jay reflects on the intentions behind the gay-in as an essential part of more serious aspects of the gay rights movement: “If we dared to hold hands and party in public, we knew unimaginable rights might follow. And they did.”

Jay was a member of Lavender Menace, a group that formed to protest the exclusion of lesbians from mainstream Women's Liberation. She was involved in the planning and execution of the "Lavender Menace Zap" at the Second Congress to Unite Women in New York City in May 1970. This zap is considered a turning-point in the history of second-wave feminism.

Also in 1970, the "Wall Street Ogle-In" took place. The events of September 1968 regarding Francine Gottfried made an impression on second-wave feminists in New York City, and in March 1970, they retaliated in a raid on Wall Street which they dubbed the "Ogle-In", in which a large group of feminists, including Jay, Alix Kates Shulman, and a number of women who had participated in the sit-in at Ladies Home Journal a few weeks before, sexually harassed male Wall Streeters on their way to work with catcalls and crude remarks.

Working with Allen Young Jay edited Out of the Closets (1972), a pioneering anthology 
that gave voice to the Radicalesbians, Martha Shelley, and writers such as Rita Mae Brown. It was during the 1970s that Jay first heard about the writers Natalie Clifford Barney and Renée Vivien, lesbian members of the American expatriate community in Paris in the 1920s and 1930s. Their lives and works became the subject of Jay's doctoral dissertation, published by Indiana University Press as The Amazon and the Page (1988).

Jay contributed the essay "Confessions of a Worrywart: Ruminations on a Lesbian Feminist Overview" to the anthology Sisterhood Is Forever: The Women's Anthology for a New Millennium (2003), edited by Robin Morgan.

At the presentation of Pace University's 10th Annual Dyson Distinguished Achievement Awards on April 6, 2006, Jay was honored with the Distinguished Faculty Award. She received the Bill Whitehead Award for Lifetime Achievement from Publishing Triangle in 2006.

Jay is featured in the feminist history film She's Beautiful When She's Angry.

Her papers are held in the Archives & Manuscripts Division of the New York Public Library.

Works

Books

Editor

Journals and media

Essays

Thesis

References

External links
 
 She's Beautiful When She's Angry (2014), interview with  Karla Jay.

1947 births
Living people
American feminist writers
American women non-fiction writers
Jewish American writers
Jewish feminists
Lesbian academics
Lesbian feminists
American lesbian writers
LGBT Jews
LGBT people from New York (state)
American academics of English literature
Pace University faculty
Barnard College alumni
Gay Liberation Front members
Lavender Menace members
Lambda Literary Award winners
American women academics
21st-century American Jews
21st-century American women writers